Legend Valley (formerly Buckeye Lake Music Center) is an outdoor concert venue located in Thornville, Ohio, approximately two miles from Buckeye Lake.

Events

See also
List of contemporary amphitheatres

Music venues in Ohio